Ikenotani Tameike Dam is an earthfill dam located in Tottori prefecture in Japan. The dam is used for irrigation. The catchment area of the dam is  km2. The dam impounds about 8  ha of land when full and can store 616 thousand cubic meters of water.

References

Dams in Tottori Prefecture
1923 establishments in Japan